Garden International School, Eastern Seaboard, Ban Chang, also known as the Garden International School Rayong (GIS) is located in Ban Chang district, around 170 kilometers to the south-east of Bangkok. 

The school was established in 1994. It offers a British curriculum and has full accreditation from the Council of International Schools (CIS). It follows the UK National Curriculum in all year groups; at secondary level it teaches IGCSEs and then switches to the International Baccalaureate Diploma Programme. Its students sit the International General Certificate of Secondary Education (IGCSE) and the International Baccalaureate Diploma (IB)   

GIS has a decent academic record. In 2018, 89% of students scored at least five IGCSEs with grades A*-Cs and 40% were graded A* or A. In the IBDP, the average score was five points above the global average at 35. The majority of its students go on to study at universities in the UK, US, Canada, Australia and Thailand.

There are around 480 students representing more than 40 different nationalities. As well as involving all students’ in house activities, the school has a daily programme of extra-curricular activities, with many being run by the teachers and free of charge.

GIS is part of the Malaysia-based Taylor's Education Group, which owns schools across South East Asia.

Facilities 
GIS is fully equipped with 2 swimming pools, a football field, library, auditorium and music classrooms.

See also 
Rayong English Programme School
Garden International School Bangkok

References 

Rayong province
British international schools in Thailand
Educational institutions established in 1994
1994 establishments in Thailand